The Singrauli–Hazrat Nizamuddin Superfast Express is a Superfast train belonging to West Central Railway zone that runs between  and  in India. It is currently operated with 22167/22168 train numbers on a weekly basis.

Service
The 22167/Singrauli–Hazrat Nizamuddin SF Express has an average speed of 59 km/hr and covers 1073 km in 18h 20m. The 22168/Hazrat Nizamuddin–Singrauli SF Express has an average speed of 57 km/hr and covers 1073 km in 18h 45m.

Route and halts 
The important halts of the train are:

Coach composition
The train has standard ICF rakes with a maximum speed of 110 kmph. The train consists of 17 coaches:

 1 First AC
 1 AC II Tier
 2 AC III Tier
 8 Sleeper coaches
 6 General Unreserved
 2 Seating cum Luggage Rake

Rake sharing 
The train shares its rake with 22165/22166 Bhopal–Singrauli Superfast Express.

See also 
 Singrauli railway station
 Hazrat Nizamuddin railway station
 Bhopal–Singrauli Superfast Express

Notes

References

External links 
 22167/Singrauli–Hazrat Nizamuddin Superfast Express India Rail Info
 22168/Hazrat Nizamuddin–Singrauli Superfast Express India Rail Info

Transport in Delhi
Express trains in India
Rail transport in Madhya Pradesh
Rail transport in Uttar Pradesh
Rail transport in Haryana
Rail transport in Delhi
Railway services introduced in 2017
Singrauli